Lignana is a comune (municipality) in the Province of Vercelli in the Italian region Piedmont, located about  northeast of Turin and about  southwest of Vercelli.

Lignana borders the following municipalities: Crova, Desana, Ronsecco, Salasco, Sali Vercellese, and Vercelli.

Tenuta Veneria, together with Selve (frazione of the comune of Salasco), was a filming location for Bitter Rice, a 1949 movie starring Silvana Mangano.

References

Cities and towns in Piedmont